USNS Alatna, was a gasoline T1 tanker specially constructed for service in polar regions, was launched on 6 September 1956 at Staten Island, New York, by the Bethlehem Steel Corporation, sponsored by Mrs. Wilma Miles, and placed in service with the Military Sea Transportation Service in July 1957.

Manned by a civil service crew, Alatna carried petroleum products from ports along the Atlantic and gulf coasts and in the Caribbean Sea to scattered American outposts in both polar regions. For more than 15 years, the tanker and her crew struggled against snow, wind, and ice to support American military bases in the Arctic and American scientists in the Antarctic. On 8 August 1972, Alatna was placed out of service and laid up with the Maritime Commission's National Defense Reserve Fleet at Suisun Bay, California.

The Alatna Valley in the Antarctic was named after this ship.

References
  NavSource Online: Service Ship Photo Archive T-AOG / T-AOT-81 Alatna

Attribution
 

1956 ships
Ships built in Sparrows Point, Maryland
Alatna-class gasoline tankers